Russkaya Polyana is an urban locality (a work settlement) and the administrative center of the Russko-Polyansky District in Omsk Oblast, Russia. Population:

References

Urban-type settlements in Omsk Oblast